Ocimar de Almeida Júnior or simply Júnior Urso (born 10 March 1989) is a Brazilian professional footballer who plays as a defensive midfielder for Coritiba.

Career

Brazil 
Júnior started his career in Santo André. In 2010, he transferred to Ituano. After a good performance in early 2011, he had his federative rights purchased to Avaí and was loaned to Paraná Clube immediately. In the middle of 2011 season, Avaí called back Junior Urso to play in the Série A. He made his debut for Avaí in the game which Avaí loses to Grêmio in Ressacada. In the end of 2011, he was hired with Coritiba.

Shandong Luneng 
In February 2014, Urso moved to Chinese Super League giants Shandong Luneng and proceeded to score the first goal of the season against Harbin Yiteng.

Loan to Atlético Mineiro 
Following contract disputes with Shandong Luneng, the Chinese club loaned Urso back to Brazil where he played the 2016 season with Atlético Mineiro. The loan fee was a reported US$2 million (R$7.2 million).

Guangzhou R&F 
On 9 January 2017, Júnior moved to fellow Super League side Guangzhou R&F.

Corinthians 
On 4 February 2019, Júnior Urso returned to Brazil, signing with Corinthians after Guangzhou terminated his contract. He made his debut for the team on 17 February against São Paulo FC in the 2019 Campeonato Paulista, a competition Corinthians would go on to win. Three days later he scored his first goal for the club in a 4–2 win over Avenida in the Copa do Brasil.

Orlando City 
On 6 January 2020, Corinthians confirmed the sale of Urso to MLS team Orlando City ahead of the 2020 season, reportedly for a fee of $900k. Orlando announced his arrival the following week. Urso made his debut for the team in the season opener, captaining the side in place of the suspended Nani as Orlando earned a 0–0 draw against Real Salt Lake. On 29 August 2020, Urso scored the opener in a 3–1 win over Atlanta United, Orlando's first ever win in the rivalry's history. On 10 November 2022, Orlando City and Urso mutually agreed to terminate his contract, allowing Urso to return to Brazil for personal reasons. In three seasons, he made a total of 100 appearances in all competitions and scored 14 goals.

Personal life
Urso's brother is former professional footballer Peter de Almeida who retired in 2015 to become Junior's agent.

Career statistics

Honours

Club
Coritiba
 Campeonato Paranaense: 2012, 2013

Shandong Luneng
 Chinese FA Cup: 2014
 Chinese FA Super Cup: 2015

Corinthians
Campeonato Paulista: 2019

Orlando City
U.S. Open Cup: 2022

Individual
Campeonato Mineiro Team of the Tournament: 2016
Campeonato Paulista Team of the Tournament: 2019

References

External links
 
  zerozero

Living people
1989 births
Brazilian footballers
Esporte Clube Santo André players
Paraná Clube players
Avaí FC players
Coritiba Foot Ball Club players
Clube Atlético Mineiro players
Sport Club Corinthians Paulista players
Campeonato Brasileiro Série A players
Expatriate footballers in China
Shandong Taishan F.C. players
Guangzhou City F.C. players
Brazilian expatriate sportspeople in China
Chinese Super League players
Association football midfielders
Brazilian expatriate footballers
Orlando City SC players
Brazilian expatriate sportspeople in the United States
Major League Soccer players
People from Taboão da Serra